Polar Air Cargo Worldwide Inc., a subsidiary of Atlas Air Worldwide Holdings, is a cargo airline based in Purchase, New York, United States. It operates scheduled all-cargo services to North America, Asia, Europe, and the Middle East. Its main base is Cincinnati/Northern Kentucky International Airport, with hubs at Los Angeles International Airport, Hong Kong International Airport, Narita International Airport and Incheon International Airport near Seoul, South Korea.

History 

Polar was formed in 1993 as a joint venture between Southern Air Transport and GE Capital Aviation Services (GECAS). It started operations in June 1993 and began with charter flights, later adding scheduled services. During 1994, Polar was certified as a supplemental air carrier by the Federal Aviation Administration and on 4 July 1994 as a US all-cargo carrier by the United States Department of Transportation. After several years of continued growth, the remainder of the company was acquired by GECAS. 

In November 2001, Polar was acquired by Atlas Air Worldwide Holdings (AAWW), whose Atlas Air subsidiary is a provider of ACMI (aircraft, crew, maintenance and insurance) freighter leasing. Polar became the scheduled service provider for AAWW, while Atlas continued to supply Boeing 747-400 freighters on a wet-lease basis to major airlines. In October 2006, it was announced that DHL Express would be acquiring a 49% stake in Polar. , Polar is still majority-owned by Atlas Air Worldwide Holdings (51%) and has 736 employees.

Destinations

Scheduled services
Polar provides scheduled freight service covering the transpacific, transatlantic, trans-Asia, and Middle East markets. Polar offers frequent flights to China, connecting Shanghai to the United States and multiple points in Asia and Europe, e.g., Leipzig/Halle Airport in Germany & East Midlands Airport in the United Kingdom

Charter services

Polar Air Cargo also offers its customers charter freight services, using its fleet of Boeing 747 and 767. Polar and its sister company, Atlas Air, also do extensive work for the U.S. Air Force’s Air Mobility Command (AMC).

Fleet

Current fleet

The Polar Air Cargo fleet consists of the following aircraft:

Former fleet
Polar Air Cargo formerly operated the following aircraft:

References

Sources
 https://www.bloomberg.com/news/2011-01-20/atlas-air-worldwide-boosts-dhl-freighter-service.html

External links 

Airlines established in 1993
Airlines based in New York (state)
Cargo airlines of the United States
Companies based in Purchase, New York
2001 mergers and acquisitions
American companies established in 1993